Daniel R. Langton is Professor of Jewish History in the department of Religions & Theology at the University of Manchester, England.

Education 
Langton was home schooled before studying History for his BA (Hons) 1991-94 and PhD 1994-98 at the Parkes Centre for the Study of Jewish/Non-Jewish Relations at the University of Southampton.

Career 
Langton has taught at the University of Manchester, in the department of Religions and Theology, since 2001. He is co-director of the Centre for Jewish Studies and co-editor of the journal Melilah. He was an AHRC Leadership Fellow for 2016-17 with a project entitled 'The Doubting Jew' and Leverhulme Major Research Fellow 2013-15 with a project entitled 'Darwin's Jews'. He was a recipient of the University of Manchester Teaching Excellence Prize in 2006. He was President 2014-15 and Secretary 2002-10 of the British Association for Jewish Studies (BAJS), and Secretary 2010-14 of the European Association for Jewish Studies (EAJS).

Works 
Langton has explored the history of Jewish-Christian relations and modern Jewish thought and identity in a variety of contexts, including Jewish New Testament studies, the origins of Anglo-Reform and Anglo-Liberal Judaism, Israel and Zionism, Holocaust Theology, and Jewish religious engagement with Jewish views on evolution and with Atheism.

Books 

Reform Judaism and Darwin: How Engaging with Evolutionary Theory Shaped American Jewish Religion(2019), which is a survey of Reform Jewish engagement with evolutionary theory

The Apostle Paul in the Jewish Imagination: A Study in Modern Jewish Christian Relations (2010), which is a survey of Jewish views of Paul.

Claude Montefiore: His Life and Thought (2002), which is an intellectual biography of Claude Montefiore.

Edited books 
Atheism, Scepticism and Challenges to Monotheism (2015), which presents a variety of scholarship on atheism and scepticism in Jewish contexts.

Normative Judaism? Jews, Judaism and Jewish Identity (2012), co-edited with Philip Alexander, which reflects modern scholarly debate about the nature of Judaism.

Writing the Holocaust (2011), co-edited with Jean-Marc Dreyfus, which treats a range of topics including Holocaust Theology.

Educational works 

Jews and Christians Perspectives on Mission (2011), with Reuven Silverman and Patrick Morrow, which is a contribution to Interfaith dialogue.

Children of Zion: Jewish and Christian Perspectives on the Holy Land (2008), which is a contribution to Interfaith dialogue.

Full Bibliography 
A full list of Langton's publications, including reviews of his works, can be found at
http://www.manchester.ac.uk/research/daniel.r.langton/

Academics of the University of Manchester
British historians
British theologians
Year of birth missing (living people)
Living people
Historians of Jews and Judaism